Fabio Gattari was born in Tolentino in 1958. He is the Director of Etere Pte. In its beginnings, Etere was the first Italian company to produce television and radio software for scheduling and automation. Gattari is also a Software Analyst and Systems Planner.

Career 
In 1976, Fabio founded the company GB elettronica together with Carlo Barabucci. With this company project, he had built and supported Radio transmitters in the Marche region in Italy.

From 1982 to 1985, Gattari worked with Effe Computers in Macerata Italy, HP concessionaire, where he programmed several software such as notary office management software (SETA), legal office management software and building site accounting management software. This was one of the first software developed for touch-screen at that time and the HP150 was one of the first PCs with built-in touch screen.

Gattari founded SIS (Societa Italiana Software) in 1987. This company would later be renamed Etere  Etere provides media enterprise software for broadcasters and media companies around the world, with Fabio Gattari as its director. SIS's first product was the SETA software built in 1992, it started with a traffic and billing system for radio stations integrated with a digital playout using standard PC and an audio card  produced by another Italian company, Audiologic (https://www.audiologic.it/) this software was the first in the world to produce a full audio broadcast  using standard PC and audio stored in a Networked File server shared with multiple users using Novell Netware software. SIS has always had an active connection with AER  to produce its traffic, billing and scheduling software with all the documents as requested by the Italian law for broadcasters.

Gattari has led many innovations while at the helm of Etere including Media Asset Management (MAM) and Media Enterprise Resources Planning (MERP).

During the span of his career, Gattari has created many innovations including the first Digital Audio Broadcasting system based on PCs and local network connectivity in 1992. Fabio obtained CNE (Certified Novell Engineer) from Novell, the company that produces local network software with SFT III systems specialization in 1993. In his entrepreneurship spirit, he became a founding partner of SKYBUS S.R.L which deals in satellite digital systems management for Italian radio syndication in 1994.

From 2012, Gattari left Italy to escape the economical and business problems of the country and joined as a director to Singycon pte ltd. He developed a new business for the media industry in the APAC region and moved to Singapore. In January 2015, Singycon acquired Etere remaining business after the forced bankruptcy of Etere srl and moved its headquarters to Singapore under the leadership of its director, Gattari. Some of the former Etere srl Employees formed a company MERP, to save their jobs as the unemployment rate in Italy is increasing. Etere Singapore choose to use the Italian company as their component supplier for its products.

Fabio Gattari has been speaking at international conferences regarding topics of his expertise for many years. In May 2016, Fabio Gattari presented at Asia's international conference for the pro-audio, film and broadcasting industry, BroadcastAsia2016.

References 

Living people
Italian chief executives
1958 births